Let's Go Square Dancing is an Australian television series which aired in 1960 on ABC. The half-hour series featured square-dancing, with Jim Vickers-Willis as the caller. The series aired live. It was produced in Melbourne, and kinescoped for broadcast in Sydney (and possibly other ABC stations). It is not known if any of these kinescope recordings still exist.

References

External links
Let's Go Square Dancing on IMDb

1960 Australian television series debuts
1960 Australian television series endings
Black-and-white Australian television shows
English-language television shows
Australian Broadcasting Corporation original programming
Dance television shows